Blastfighter is a 1984 action film directed by Lamberto Bava starring Michael Sopkiw and George Eastman.

Plot
Jake "Tiger" Sharp (Michael Sopkiw) is a former policeman who seeks revenge after his wife is murdered. After killing the murderer, Sharp is sentenced to seven years in prison. Upon release Jake is given an SPAS-12 Shotgun by his old friend Jerry in order to wreak vengeance upon the crooked attorney responsible for sending him away. However, Jake instead at the last minute decides to return to his secluded cabin in the Appalachian wilderness and bury his gun in the floorboards. Matters become complicated when a group of poachers run afoul of him and kill his baby deer. Jake goes to the Chinese herbal medicinist's office that the hunters have been selling to and smashes up the place.

Jake's estranged daughter Connie then joins him with Jerry and her boyfriend, but all of them are killed off when the hunters decide to get revenge for scaring away the herbal medicinist. Jake manages to escape back to his cabin and dig up his gun for one last battle with those who would break the law.

Production
Blastfighter was initially going to be a post-apocalyptic film directed by Lucio Fulci with screenwriter Dardano Sacchetti as a follow-up to Warriors of the Year 2072. Sacchetti later explained that Fulci argued with the producers, which led to it being settled in court. The film had already been sold without the original intended script being able to be used, so Lamberto Bava's Blastfighter only retains the title of the original Fulci production.

Release
Blastfighter was released theatrically in Italy where it was distributed by Medusa Distribuzione on 25 July 1984.

Footnotes

References

External links
 

1984 films
1984 action films
Italian action films
Films directed by Lamberto Bava
Films scored by Guido & Maurizio De Angelis
Films scored by Fabio Frizzi
Films set in the United States
1980s exploitation films
Italian films about revenge
Italian vigilante films
1980s Italian films